Chodos/Xodos (Valencian: Chodos) is a municipality in the comarca of l'Alcalatén in the Valencian Country.

References

Municipalities in the Province of Castellón